Blackman, Originally Blæcmann, is an Old English name meaning "dark man". The name was once given to Danish Vikings who settled in southern Scotland. It is also listed in the genealogy of the kings of Bernicia. Early on, it was commonly used as a first name. Depending on how the old Anglo-Saxon blaec or blac were translated, the surname could also have had the exact opposite meaning from the above. "Blaec" meant dark/swarthy while "blac" meant fair/pale. The spelling of both words and their meanings were often confused and, over time, became interchangeable.

Variations: Blackmann,  Blackmun, Blackmon, Blakeman.

Notable people 
Alexander Wayne Blackman, British Royal Marine known as Marine A
Andrew Blackman (born 1965), Australian actor
Ann Blackman (born 1946), American biographer
Annie Blackman (born 1999), American musician
Audrey Blackman (1907–1990), British artist 
Avion Blackman (born 1976), American reggae recording artist
Aylward M. Blackman (1883–1956), British Egyptologist
Bertie Blackman (born 1982), Australian singer, songwriter, and guitarist
Bob Blackman (American football) (1918–2000), American football player and coach
Bob Blackman (born 1956), British politician (Harrow East; earlier London)
Calvin Blackman Bridges (1889–1938), American geneticist
Charles Blackman (1928–2018), Australian artist
Cindy Blackman (born 1959), American musician
Courtney Blackman (1933–2021), Barbadian economist, international business consultant, and diplomat
Don Blackman (1953–2013), American musician
Eric G. Blackman (born 1968), American astrophysicist and professor
Fred Blackman (1884–after 1922), British footballer
Frederick Blackman (1866–1947), British botanist (brother of Vernon Herbert Blackman; uncle of Geoffrey Emett Blackman)
Garfield Blackman (given name of Ras Shorty I, 1941–2000), Trinidadian musician
George Blackman (1897–2003), Barbadian soldier in WWI
Sir George Blackman (1767-1836) Governor, Bank of England
Helena Blackman (born 1982), British actress
Henry E. Blackman (born 1820), American politician and farmer
Honor Blackman (1925–2020), British actress
Jack Blackman (1920–1978), Australian footballer
Jeremy Blackman (born 1985), American actor
Joan Blackman (born 1938), American actress
Joe Blackman (born 1984), British entrepreneur
John Blackman (born 1947), Australian radio and television presenter, and voice actor
John Lucie Blackman (1793–1815), British soldier killed at the Battle of Waterloo
Josh Blackman (born 1984), American lawyer and law professor 
Ken Blackman (born 1972), American professional football player
Kirsty Blackman (born 1986), British politician
Latonia Blackman (born 1982), Barbadian netball player
Lionel Blackman, British solicitor advocate
Liz Blackman (born 1949), British politician (Erewash)
Lloyd Blackman (born 1983), British footballer
Lloyd Blackman (musician) (born 1928), Canadian violinist, conductor, composer, and educator
Lucie Blackman (1978–2000), British club hostess, murdered by Joji Obara
Luther Meade Blackman (1834–1919), American tombstone engraver, lawyer, politician, and farmer
Malorie Blackman OBE (born 1962), British author of juvenile fiction
Margaret B. Blackman (born 1944) American anthropologist
Moses Blackman (1908–1983), South African-born British crystallographer
Nick Blackman (born 1989), British-Israeli footballer
Nicole Blackman (born 1971), American performance artist, poet, author, and vocalist
Paul Blackman (born 1958), British theatrical producer and director
Ralph Beebe Blackman (1904–1990), American mathematician and engineer
Reasonable Blackman (fl. 1579–1592), African-British silk weaver
Roberta Blackman-Woods (born 1957), British politician (City of Durham)
Robyn Blackman (born 1959), New Zealand field hockey player, Olympian
Rolando Blackman (born 1959), Panamanian basketball player and coach
Steve Blackman (born 1963), American professional wrestler
Ted Blackman (1942–2002), Canadian sports journalist
Toni Blackman (born 1968), American rap artist, actress, and writer
Walter Blackman, American Republican member of the Arizona House of Representatives 
William Blackman (disambiguation)
Woodie Blackman (1922–2010), Barbadian author and college administrator

Other uses
 Blackman, Tennessee, an unincorporated community

See also
Blachman 
Black man (disambiguation)

English-language surnames